Wülfershausen is a municipality in the district of Rhön-Grabfeld in Bavaria in Germany, located on the Saale River. The municipality consists of these two villages: Wülfershausen and Eichenhausen. The township is a member of the administrative community called "Verwaltungsgemeinschaft" Saal an der Saale.

References

Rhön-Grabfeld